Abdul Karim (1871 – 1953), known as Abdul Karim Sahitya Bisharad, was a Bengali littérateur, historian of Bangla literature and collector and interpreter of old Bangla manuscripts.

Early life
Karim was born in Suchakradandi village, Bengal Presidency, British India (now in Patiya Upazila, Chittagong District, Bangladesh). He passed his Entrance Examination in 1893 from Patiya High School. He served as a teacher in few schools. He later joined the office of the Divisional Commissioner of Chittagong and became Divisional Inspector of schools. He retired from the position in 1934.

Literary career

Karim had a special research interest in Muslim contribution to Bengali Literature in the medieval period. He collected puthis (old Bangla manuscripts). The Bangiya Sahitya Parisad published his catalog of Bengali manuscripts titled Bangala Prachin Puthir Bivaran in two volumes in 1920–21. The Department of Bengali of the University of Dhaka published a catalog of the manuscripts preserved in the University Library under the title Puthi Parichiti.

Karim edited and published eleven old Bengali texts and a book on the history and culture of Chittagong, titled Islamabad. Daulat Qazi, Alaol, Syed Sultan and Muhamad Khan were notable Bengali poets. Karim discovered about a hundred Muslim poets whose names and works were not known before.

Literary Association of Nadia honored him with the title of Sahitya Sagar and Chattal Dharmamandali Sabha gave him the title of Sahitya Visharad.

Legacy
The Government of Bangladesh conferred Independence Day Award to Karim posthumously in 1995.

References

Further reading
Golpo Songroho (Collected Stories), the national textbook of B.A. (pass and subsidiary) course of Bangladesh, published by University of Dhaka in 1979 (reprint in 1986).
Bangla Sahitya (Bengali Literature), the national textbook of the intermediate (college) level of Bangladesh published in 1996 by all educational boards.

1870s births
1953 deaths
Bengali-language writers
20th-century Bengalis
Bengali Muslims
Bangladeshi writers
Bengali writers
People from Chittagong
Recipients of the Independence Day Award
Bengali historians